Robert F. Holden is an American professor, graphic designer, and the New York City Council member for the 30th district, representing the neighborhoods of Glendale, Maspeth, Middle Village, Ridgewood, and parts of Woodside and Woodhaven in the borough of Queens.

Early life and education
Holden was raised in Maspeth, Queens. He earned an AAS from the New York City College of Technology, a BA from Queens College, and an MFA from Hunter College, all CUNY schools.

Career
Holden is a professional graphic designer and a professor of the same at the New York City College of Technology.

Holden has also worked as an editor and art director for Juniper Berry magazine, and as a photojournalist published in newspapers and magazines in the United States and Europe. He has had his work exhibited at International Center of Photography, and other galleries.

Holden has been a member of Queens Community Board 5 since 1988.

In October 2022, Holden endorsed George Santos's candidacy for New York's 3rd congressional district in the U.S. House elections.

New York City Council

2017 election
Holden, a long-registered Democrat, ran in the 2017 Democratic primary for New York City Council against incumbent Democrat Elizabeth Crowley, but lost 63.6% to 36.1%. In the general election, Holden ran on the Republican, Conservative, Reform Party lines, as well as the independent "Dump de Blasio" line. Despite not being a registered member of the Republican party, he was able to receive the county's nomination by obtaining a Wilson Pakula authorization.

Holden won a tight race, garnering 10,653 votes to Crowley’s 10,426.

2018
Holden was the prime sponsor in introducing and passing resolutions 420, 421, and 422. The resolutions declared November 11 as Polish Independence Day, October 15 as Tadeusz Kosciuszko Day, and October 11 as Casimir Pulaski Day in New York City, respectively. The bills all passed unanimously on October 31, 2018.

2020 
In early April 2020, he and New York City Councilman Republican Eric Ulrich wrote to Mayor de Blasio asking him to relieve Commissioner of Health of the City of New York  Oxiris Barbot of her position "before it’s too late," saying her guidance on coronavirus had been disastrous.

Election history

2017

2021

 Holden is a registered Democrat but received the Republican party's nomination after losing the Democratic primary.

Personal life
As of 2017, Holden had been married to his wife, Amy, for 44 years. They have three children and three grandchildren.

References

External links
Campaign website
New York City Council: District 30 - Robert Holden

	

 

1951 births
Living people
21st-century American politicians
People from Maspeth, Queens
Queens College, City University of New York alumni
Hunter College alumni
American graphic designers
New York City Council members
New York (state) Democrats